Humberto de Araújo Benvenuto (4 December 1904, Rio de Janeiro, Brazil — 24 July 1949, Rio de Janeiro, Brazil) was a Brazilian football player. He played for the Brazil national team. In archival documents about his birth, the surname of his father and mother is spelled Benvenuto. But in life, Umberto had the nickname "Benê", so often his last name was written as both Benvenuto and Benevenuto. Humberto de Araujo Benvenuto was part of the Brazilian delegation to the first World Cup tournament in Uruguay in 1930. But he was not included in the squad of 22 players, like Alfredo de Almeida Rego or Doca.

He started his career in the team Americano de Campos de Goytacazes, from his hometown of Rio, then moved for two seasons to another small team, Jequié de Bahia, then the talented midfielder was noticed by the 1st "big" club in his life - Flamengo, where he stayed on 5 years. With Flamengo he won two Carioca championships and is even called up to Seleção. In total, he played 119 matches for the club (56 wins, 17 draws and 46 losses) and scored 13 goals.

Before the 1930 World Cup, he left to play for the Atletico Mineiro club from the state of Minas Gerais. At the World Cup, Benevenuto did not play a single match like that. After Atlético, he returned to Flamengo, from where he moved to the Botafogo club, in which he won his third Carioca title.

Then there was a short trip to Uruguay, to Peñarol, in which his game was not bright, then a return to Brazil, where he plays for many clubs, never staying anywhere for more than 2 years. Then he played in a small club "Olympico" from Rio. And he ended his career at Atlético Mineiro, the last match for which he played on October 11, 1936 against Retiru (4: 0); he scored two goals.

After the 1930 World Cup, Benvenuto played in two friendly matches for the Brazil national team: on August 10 against Yugoslavia (he came on as a substitute), and on August 17 against the U.S. team. These are all his matches for the national team.

Humberto de Araujo Benvenuto died suddenly on June 24, 1949 at the age of 44. In memory of the footballer, at the initiative of the referee Alberto da Gama Malscher, the Botafogo and Gremio clubs agreed to hold a match in favor of the family, which remained in a difficult financial situation.

Honours

Club
 Campeonato Carioca (3): 
Flamengo: 1925, 1927, 1932

References

1903 births
Year of death missing
Footballers from Rio de Janeiro (city)
Brazilian footballers
Brazilian expatriate footballers
Brazil international footballers
Peñarol players
Brazilian expatriate sportspeople in Uruguay
Expatriate footballers in Uruguay
1930 FIFA World Cup players
Botafogo de Futebol e Regatas players
CR Flamengo footballers
Clube Atlético Mineiro players
Associação Portuguesa de Desportos players
Association football defenders